In geometry, a prism is a polyhedron comprising an  polygon base, a second base which is a translated copy (rigidly moved without rotation) of the first, and  other faces, necessarily all parallelograms, joining corresponding sides of the two bases. All cross-sections parallel to the bases are translations of the bases. Prisms are named after their bases, e.g. a prism with a pentagonal base is called a pentagonal prism. Prisms are a subclass of prismatoids.

Like many basic geometric terms, the word prism was first used in Euclid's Elements. Euclid defined the term in Book XI as “a solid figure contained by two opposite, equal and parallel planes, while the rest are parallelograms”. However, this definition has been criticized for not being specific enough in relation to the nature of the bases, which caused confusion among later geometry writers.

Oblique vs right 
An oblique prism is a prism in which the joining edges and faces are not perpendicular to the base faces.

Example: a parallelepiped is an oblique prism whose base is a parallelogram, or equivalently a polyhedron with six parallelogram faces.

A right prism is a prism in which the joining edges and faces are perpendicular to the base faces. This applies if and only if all the joining faces are rectangular.

The dual of a right n-prism is a right n-bipyramid.

A right prism (with rectangular sides) with regular n-gon bases has Schläfli symbol { }×{n}. It approaches a cylindrical solid as n approaches infinity; a cylinder is considered a circular prism.

Special cases 
A right rectangular prism (with a rectangular base) is also called a cuboid, or informally a rectangular box. A right rectangular prism has Schläfli symbol { }×{ }×{ }.

A right square prism (with a square base) is also called a square cuboid, or informally a square box.

Note: some texts may apply the term rectangular prism or square prism to both a right rectangular-based prism and a right square-based prism.

Regular prism 
A regular prism is a prism with regular bases.

Uniform prism 
A uniform prism or semiregular prism is a right prism with regular bases and all edges of the same length.

Thus all the side faces of a uniform prism are squares.

Thus all the faces of a uniform prism are regular polygons. Also, such prisms are isogonal; thus they are uniform polyhedra alright. They form one of the two infinite series of semiregular polyhedra, the other series being formed by the antiprisms.

A uniform n-gonal prism has Schläfli symbol t{2,n}.

Volume 
The volume of a prism is the product of the area of the base by the height, i.e. the distance between the two base faces (in the case of a non-right prism, note that this means the perpendicular distance).

The volume is therefore:

where B is the base area and h is the height.

The volume of a prism whose base is an n-sided regular polygon with side length s is therefore:

Surface area 
The surface area of a right prism is:

where B is the area of the base, h the height, and P the base perimeter.

The surface area of a right prism whose base is a regular n-sided polygon with side length s, and with height h, is therefore:

Schlegel diagrams

Symmetry 
The symmetry group of a right n-sided prism with regular base is Dnh of order 4n, except in the case of a cube, which has the larger symmetry group Oh of order 48, which has three versions of D4h as subgroups. The rotation group is Dn of order 2n, except in the case of a cube, which has the larger symmetry group O of order 24, which has three versions of D4 as subgroups.

The symmetry group Dnh contains inversion iff n is even.

The hosohedra and dihedra also possess dihedral symmetry, and an n-gonal prism can be constructed via the geometrical truncation of an n-gonal hosohedron, as well as through the cantellation or expansion of an n-gonal dihedron.

Truncated prism 
A truncated prism is a prism with non-parallel top and bottom faces.

Twisted prism 
A twisted prism is a nonconvex polyhedron constructed from a uniform n-prism with each side face bisected on the square diagonal, by twisting the top, usually by  radians ( degrees) in the same direction, causing sides to be concave.

A twisted prism cannot be dissected into tetrahedra without adding new vertices. The smallest case: the triangular form, is called a Schönhardt polyhedron.

An n-gonal twisted prism is topologically identical to the n-gonal uniform antiprism, but has half the symmetry group: Dn, [n,2]+, order 2n. It can be seen as a nonconvex antiprism, with tetrahedra removed between pairs of triangles.

Frustum 
A frustum is a similar construction to a prism, with trapezoid lateral faces and differently sized top and bottom polygons.

Star prism 

A star prism is a nonconvex polyhedron constructed by two identical star polygon faces on the top and bottom, being parallel and offset by a distance and connected by rectangular faces. A uniform star prism will have Schläfli symbol {p/q} × { }, with p rectangle and 2 {p/q} faces. It is topologically identical to a p-gonal prism.

Crossed prism 
A crossed prism is a nonconvex polyhedron constructed from a prism, where the vertices of one base are inverted around the center of this base (or rotated by 180°). This transforms the side rectangular faces into crossed rectangles. For a regular polygon base, the appearance is an n-gonal hour glass. All oblique edges pass through a single body center. Note: no vertex is at this body centre. A crossed prism is topologically identical to an n-gonal prism.

Toroidal prism 
A toroidal prism is a nonconvex polyhedron like a crossed prism, but without bottom and top base faces, and with simple rectangular side faces closing the polyhedron. This can only be done for even-sided base polygons. These are topological tori, with Euler characteristic of zero. The topological polyhedral net can be cut from two rows of a square tiling (with vertex configuration 4.4.4.4): a band of n squares, each attached to a crossed rectangle. An n-gonal toroidal prism has 2n vertices, 2n faces: n squares and n crossed rectangles, and 4n edges. It is topologically self-dual.

Prismatic polytope 
A prismatic polytope is a higher-dimensional generalization of a prism. An n-dimensional prismatic polytope is constructed from two-dimensional polytopes, translated into the next dimension.

The prismatic n-polytope elements are doubled from the -polytope elements and then creating new elements from the next lower element.

Take an n-polytope with fi i-face elements. Its-polytope prism will have  i-face elements. (With , .)

By dimension:
Take a polygon with n vertices, n edges. Its prism has 2n vertices, 3n edges, and  faces.
Take a polyhedron with v vertices, e edges, and f faces. Its prism has 2v vertices,  edges,  faces, and  cells.
Take a polychoron with v vertices, e edges, f faces, and c cells. Its prism has 2v vertices,  edges,  faces,   cells, and  hypercells.

Uniform prismatic polytope 

A regular n-polytope represented by Schläfli symbol  can form a uniform prismatic-polytope represented by a Cartesian product of two Schläfli symbols: 

By dimension:
A 0-polytopic prism is a line segment, represented by an empty Schläfli symbol { }.

A 1-polytopic prism is a rectangle, made from 2 translated line segments. It is represented as the product Schläfli symbol { }×{ }. If it is square, symmetry can be reduced: 
Example: , Square, { }×{ }, two parallel line segments, connected by two line segment sides.
A polygonal prism is a 3-dimensional prism made from two translated polygons connected by rectangles. A regular polygon {p} can construct a uniform n-gonal prism represented by the product {p}×{ }. If , with square sides symmetry it becomes a cube: 
Example: , Pentagonal prism, {5}×{ }, two parallel pentagons connected by 5 rectangular sides.
A polyhedral prism is a 4-dimensional prism made from two translated polyhedra connected by 3-dimensional prism cells. A regular polyhedron {p,q} can construct the uniform polychoric prism, represented by the product {p,q}×{ }. If the polyhedron and the sides are cubes, it becomes a tesseract: {4,3}×{ } = 
Example: , Dodecahedral prism, {5,3}×{ }, two parallel dodecahedra connected by 12 pentagonal prism sides.
...

Higher order prismatic polytopes also exist as cartesian products of any two or more polytopes. The dimension of a product polytope is the sum of the dimensions of its elements. The first examples of these exist in 4-dimensional space; they are called duoprisms as the product of two polygons in 4-dimensions.

Regular duoprisms are represented as {p}×{q}, with pq vertices, 2pq edges, pq square faces, p q-gon faces, q p-gon faces, and bounded by p q-gonal prisms and q p-gonal prisms.

For example, {4}×{4}, a 4-4 duoprism is a lower symmetry form of a tesseract, as is {4,3}×{ }, a cubic prism. {4}×{4}×{ } (4-4 duoprism prism), {4,3}×{4} (cube-4 duoprism) and {4,3,3}×{ } (tesseractic prism) are lower symmetry forms of a 5-cube.

See also 
Apeirogonal prism
Rectified prism
Prismanes
List of shapes

References 

  Chapter 2: Archimedean polyhedra, prisma and antiprisms

External links 

Paper models of prisms and antiprisms Free nets of prisms and antiprisms
Paper models of prisms and antiprisms Using nets generated by Stella

Prismatoid polyhedra
Uniform polyhedra